Lorenzo Litta (23 February 1756 – 1 May 1820) was an Italian littérateur and churchman, who became a Cardinal.

Biography
Litta was born in Milan, a member of the noble Litta family.

As a youth he was sent by his parents to the Clementine College in Rome, where he made rapid progress in letters and law. Not long after the completion of his studies he was made prothonotary Apostolic by Pope Pius VI. In 1793 he was consecrated titular Archbishop of Thebes, and sent as nuncio to Poland, where he arrived in March, 1794, shortly before the start of the uprising. Notwithstanding the difficulty of his own position, he used his influence with Tadeusz Kościuszko on behalf of the Catholic Church, and saved the life of Monsignor Wojciech Skarszewski, Bishop of Chełm, already condemned to death for collaborating with Russians. He was not so successful with regard to the Bishop of Vilnius and Livonia Ignacy Jakub Massalski.

In the negotiations for the third partition of Poland, he tried to have the three states guarantee the preservation of the Church organization and property — guarantees which were violated by Catherine II of Russia. On her death Litta was sent on an extraordinary mission to Moscow for the coronation of Paul I of Russia, whence he was transferred as ambassador of Pius VI to St. Petersburg, to settle, according to Paul's wish, the affairs of the Latin and the Greek Catholic Ruthenian (Belarusian and Ukrainian) church. He secured the restoration of six dioceses of the Latin Rite and three of the Ruthenian (Połacak, Lutsk, and Brest). The restoration of the See of Kiev was prevented by the Russian Holy Synod. Church property was only partly restored, though the government was obliged to establish suitable allowances for the clergy.

Litta also induced the metropolitans of Gniezno, Poznań, and Lwów to renounce their jurisdiction over the dioceses of the Latin Rite in Russian occupied territory, these being transferred to the new metropolis of Mahiloŭ. Through his efforts also the Basilian Order was restored. In April, 1799, he had to leave Russia.

On the death of Pius VI he went to Venice to assist at the Papal conclave, 1799–1800. When he returned to Rome he was given an office in the papal treasury which enabled him to eradicate many abuses and introduce a better administration. In 1801 he was created cardinal and was made Prefect of the Congregation of the Index and, later, of Studies.

In 1809 he was expelled from Rome with Pope Pius VII and sent to Saint-Quentin on the Seine. During this exile he translated the Iliad, and wrote a series of letters containing a refutation of the four Gallican Articles of 1682, then the subject of much discussion. Some of these letters were addressed to Napoleon himself, and were later published anonymously.

Returning to Rome with Pius VII, Litta was made Prefect of Propaganda, which, under his administration, soon recovered its former status. In 1814 he became suburbicarian Bishop of Sabina, and in 1818 Cardinal Vicar of Rome.

He died at Monte Flavio, near Rome, and was buried at Rome in the church of SS. Giovanni e Paolo.

External links
Biography

1756 births
1820 deaths
Nobility from Milan
19th-century Italian cardinals
Cardinal-bishops of Sabina
Apostolic pronotaries
Apostolic Nuncios to Poland
Cardinal Vicars
Members of the Congregation for the Evangelization of Peoples
Latin archbishops of Thebes
Clergy from Milan
Cardinals created by Pope Pius VII